Mimeugnosta credibilis is a species of moth of the family Tortricidae. It is found in Minas Gerais, Brazil.

The wingspan is about 8 mm. The ground colour of the forewings is creamy, in the basal third tinged with yellow and in the distal half mixed with pink. The hindwings are pale brownish, but more creamy basally.

References

Moths described in 2002
Cochylini